Alberta Provincial Highway No. 14, commonly referred to as Highway 14, is an east-west highway in central Alberta, Canada. It stretches from Edmonton through Wainwright to the Alberta–Saskatchewan border, running parallel to the more northern Highway 16.

Along with Saskatchewan Highway 40 (with which it connects at the boundary), it forms part of the Poundmaker Trail, named after Chief Poundmaker of the Cree.

Route description 
Highway 14 begins in south Edmonton as a freeway named Whitemud Drive at the Calgary Trail / Gateway Boulevard interchange, linking to Highway 2. Leaving the city, the highway veers east and intersects Highway 21 before the divided highway ends west of South Cooking Lake. It continues east toward Tofield where it bends southeast, paralleling the main line of the Canadian National Railway, and passes through Ryley, Poe, Holden, and Bruce before intersecting Highway 36 (Veterans Memorial Highway) in Viking. The highway continues through the communities of Kinsella, Irma, Fabyan, and Wainwright, crossing Highway 41 (Buffalo Trail). The route then travels due east and intersects Highway 17 to enter Saskatchewan.

History  
Highway 14 historically began in Old Strathcona at the intersection of 104 Street (Calgary Trail) and Whyte (82) Avenue, following Whyte Avenue and 79 Avenue out of Edmonton until it was realigned to the newly constructed Sherwood Park Freeway further in the mid-1960s.  Just west of Sherwood Park, at the Highway 14X junction, Highway 14 branched south for  along present-day Anthony Henday Drive before it turned east.  In the 1980s, Highway 14 was rerouted to follow Whitemud Drive into the city; however it followed 50 Street and Sherwood Park Freeway as at the time Whitemud Drive terminated at 34 Street.  In 1999, Whitemud Drive was extended to present-day Anthony Henday Drive and Highway 14 was changed to its current alignment.

Major intersections 
From west to east:

Former Auxiliary Routes 
There are three former auxiliary routes of Highway 14 located in the Edmonton area.

Highway 14A 

There are two former alignments of Highway 14A. The first route followed Connors Road and 83 Street between Highway 14, which at the time followed Whyte (82) Avenue, and downtown Edmonton via the Low Level Bridge. The route was phased out in the 1970s.

The second route of Highway 14A was 76 Avenue through Strathcona County. Highway 14 formerly shifted south from Whyte (82) Avenue to 76 Avenue before continuing east. When the Sherwood Park Freeway opened in 1968, Highway 14 was moved to the new route and the former route was renumbered as Highway 14A. The route was phased out in the 1970s.

Highway 14X 

Highway 14X was a spur connecting Highway 14 with Highway 16A and Highway 16. The route became part of Highway 216 in 1999.

References 

014
014
Roads in Edmonton
Roads in Strathcona County